İkiçam is a village in the Korgun District of Çankırı Province in Turkey. Its population is 63 (2021).

References

Villages in Korgun District